The Púrus Arch is a basement high in Brazil that makes up the modern western boundary of the Amazon sedimentary basin. The Purús Arch is thought to be a former graben of Middle Proterozoic age that was inversed in the Late Proterozoic.

References

Basement highs
Geology of Brazil
Mesoproterozoic rifts and grabens